Glenwood is an unincorporated community and census-designated place in McDowell County, North Carolina, United States, with a rich musical heritage. It was first listed as a CDP in the 2020 census with a population of 501. Glenwood has a post office with ZIP code 28737.

Demographics

2020 census

Note: the US Census treats Hispanic/Latino as an ethnic category. This table excludes Latinos from the racial categories and assigns them to a separate category. Hispanics/Latinos can be of any race.

References

Unincorporated communities in McDowell County, North Carolina
Unincorporated communities in North Carolina
Census-designated places in McDowell County, North Carolina
Census-designated places in North Carolina